The Commission of Government was a non-elected body that governed the Dominion of Newfoundland from 1934 to 1949.  Established following the collapse of Newfoundland's economy during the Great Depression, it was dissolved when the dominion became the tenth province of Canada on March 31, 1949. It was composed of civil servants who were directly subordinate to the British Government in London.

Background
Newfoundland's economic difficulties were exacerbated by debt incurred during the First World War and the collapse of fish prices during the Depression. In 1933, following a prolonged period of economic crisis and severe budgetary deficit, and civil unrest that culminated in a riot which brought down the previous government, the government of Prime Minister Frederick C. Alderdice asked the British and Canadian governments to establish a royal commission (the Newfoundland Royal Commission) to investigate the dominion's continuing crisis and to suggest a solution to its problems.

The commission (commonly known as the "Amulree Commission") was chaired by Lord Amulree, appointed by the British government, and also included Charles Alexander Magrath, appointed by the Canadian government, and Sir William Ewen Stavert, who represented the Newfoundland government.

The commission recommended the temporary suspension of responsible government in Newfoundland, and replacing it with a Commission of Government made up of the British-appointed Governor and six commissioners appointed by the Crown made up of three British officials and three Newfoundland-born appointees.

Alderdice was in favour of this recommendation and accordingly put it to the House of Assembly, which duly approved the proposals and thus voted itself out of existence.

The Commission of Government was sworn in on 16 February 1934, with Alderdice as vice-chairman, and immediately set about reforming the administration of the country in hopes of balancing the government's budget. With the help of grants in aid from the United Kingdom, the Commission attempted to encourage agriculture and reorganize the fishing industry.  While it did much to expand government health services to rural areas, for example, it could not solve the basic economic problems of a small export-oriented country during a time of worldwide economic stagnation.

American and Canadian military spending in Newfoundland during the 1940s caused an economic boom and allowed the Commission of Government to consider how to reintroduce a system of democratic government.  However, the British government believed that wartime prosperity would be short-lived. So it established the Newfoundland National Convention in 1946 to debate constitutional options, which were submitted to the people in two referendums in 1948. By a slender majority, Newfoundlanders chose to become a province of Canada, rather than return to the status of a self-governing dominion. The Commission of Government continued to govern Newfoundland until March 31, 1949, when the dominion joined Canada.

Chairmen of Commission of Government

Members of the Commission of Government

See also
 List of Newfoundland Prime Ministers
 Newfoundland Royal Commission

References

Sources

Details as per notices in The London Gazette:
Notice dated January 31, 1934, issue no. 34021 of February 6, 1934, p. 834
Notice dated April 21, 1936, issue no. 34280 of May 1, 1936, p. 2800
Notice dated July 29, 1936, issue no. 34312 of August 7, 1936, p. 5184
Notice dated January 18, 1937, issue no. 34363 of January 26, 1937, p. 554
Notice dated May 10, 1937, issue no. 34400 of May 21, 1937, p. 3297
Notice dated September 15, 1937, issue no. 34439 of September 28, 1937, p. 6016
Notice dated May 31, 1939, issue no. 34634 of June 9, 1939, p. 3883
Notice dated March 6, 1941, issue no. 35102 of March 11, 1941, p. 1447
Notice dated June 3, 1941, issue no. 35183 of June 6, 1941, p. 3223
Notice dated July 3, 1941, issue no. 35208 of July 4, 1941, p. 3821
Notice dated September 14, 1944, issue no. 36709 of September 19, 1944, p. 4343
Notice dated September 29, 1944, issue no. 36724 of September 29, 1944, p. 4491
Notices dated September 28, 1945, issue no. 37305 of October 12, 1945, p. 5026
Notice dated September 12, 1946, issue no. 37747 of October 4, 1946, p. 4945
Notice dated January 25, 1947, issue no. 37868 of January 31, 1947, p. 559

External links
Commission of Government 1934-1949

Political history of Newfoundland and Labrador
Dominion of Newfoundland
Government agencies established in 1933
Government agencies disestablished in 1949
Defunct advisory councils in Canada